This is a list of people who were born in/raised in, lived in, or have significant relations with the American state of Massachusetts. It includes both notable people born in the Commonwealth, and other notable people who are from the Commonwealth. People from Massachusetts are called "Massachusettsans" or "Bay Staters" after the Commonwealth's nickname.

Architects
Lucius W. Briggs (1866–1940) – architect
Charles Bulfinch (1763–1844) –  architect
Elias Carter (1781–1864) –  architect
Theophilus P. Chandler Jr. (1845–1928) –  architect
Josephine Wright Chapman (1867–1943) –  architect
Charles Amos Cummings (1833-1905) –  architect
Stephen C. Earle (1839–1913) –  architect
William LeBaron Jenney (1832–1907) –  architect
Samuel McIntire (1757–1811) –  architect
Josep Lluís Sert (1902–1983) –  Spanish architect; Dean of Harvard Graduate School of Design

Artists

Harvey Ball (1921–2001) – inventor of the smiley face
Will Barnet (1911–2012) – painter
Frank Weston Benson (1862–1951) – painter
Dawn Clements (1958–2018) – artist
George Condo (born 1957) – artist and sculptor
John Singleton Copley (1738–1815) – painter
Thomas Dewing (1851–1938) – painter
Charles Dana Gibson (1867–1944) – graphic artist
Duff Goldman (born 1974) – cake artist
Nancy Graves (1939–1995) – sculptor, painter, engraver and film director
Childe Hassam (1859–1935) – painter
Winslow Homer (1836–1910)– painter
Peter Laird (born 1954) – co-creator of the comic book Teenage Mutant Ninja Turtles
Fitzhugh Lane (1804–1865) – painter
Jack Levine (1915–2010) – painter
Shawn McManus (born 1958) – comic book artist
Willard Metcalf (1858–1925) – painter
Tony Millionaire (born 1956) – cartoonist, illustrator
Lilla Cabot Perry (1848–1933) – impressionist
Ted Rall (born 1963) – political cartoonist
Robert Reid (1862–1929) – painter
René Ricard (1946–2014) – poet, art critic, painter
Norman Rockwell (1894–1978) – artist
Paul Ryan (1949–2016) – cartoonist
Albert Pinkham Ryder (1847–1917) – painter
Mark Shasha (born 1961) – painter, author
Stass Shpanin (born 1990) – visual artist listed in Guinness Book of World Records as world's youngest professional artist
Edward Simmons (1852–1931) – painter
Frank Stella (born 1936) – artist
Andrew Stevovich (born 1948) – artist
Barbara Swan (1922–2003) – artist
Edmund Charles Tarbell (1862–1938) – painter
Abbott Handerson Thayer (1849–1921) – painter
James Abbott McNeill Whistler (1834–1903) – artist
N. C. Wyeth (1882–1945) (1882–1945) – artist
John Wolcott Adams (1874–1925) – illustrator

Sculptors
Russell Gerry Crook (1869–1955) – sculptor
Cyrus Edwin Dallin (1861–1944) – sculptor; Olympic archer; namesake of Cyrus E. Dallin Art Museum
Murray Dewart (born 1947) – sculptor
Daniel Chester French (1850–1931) – neoclassical sculptor
Joseph Skinger (1911–1967) – metalsmith and sculptor

Athletes

Abdul-Malik Abu (born 1995), basketball player in the Israeli Premier Basketball League
Kim Adler − bowler
Harry Agganis (1929–1955) − baseball player
Nick Ahmed − baseball player
Kiko Alonso − football player
Tony Amonte − hockey player
Prince Amukamara − football player
Jim Arvanitis − martial artist, MMA trainer
Paul Azinger − golfer, television commentator
Jerry Azumah − football player
Jeff Bagwell (born 1968) − baseball player
Sasha Banks − professional wrestler, ring name of Mercedes Kaestner-Varnado
Tom Barrasso − hockey player
Dana Barros − basketball player
Mark Bavaro − football player
Tyler Beede − baseball player
Joe Bellino − football player, Heisman Trophy winner
Mackenzy Bernadeau − football player
Travis Best − basketball player
David Blatt (born 1959) − basketball player and coach
Brian Boyle − hockey player
 Edward Scott Bozek (1950–2022) - Olympic épée fencer
Ron Brace − football player
John Brebbia − baseball player
Andy Brickley − hockey player
Charles Brickley − football player and coach
Aimee Buchanan (born 1993) − American-born Olympic figure skater
Nick Buoniconti − Hall of Fame football player
Thomas Burke – U.S. Olympic sprinter (first gold medalist in 100 meter dash, 1896 Athens)
Geoff Cameron – U.S. soccer player
Chris Capuano − baseball pitcher
Mary Carew − sprinter, Olympic gold medalist
Michael Carter-Williams − basketball player
Brett Cecil − baseball player
John Cena − professional wrestler
Jacques Cesaire − football player
Gosder Cherilus − football player
Jack Chesbro − Hall of Fame baseball player
Alex Cobb − baseball player
Mickey Cochrane − Hall of Fame baseball player
Chris Colabello − baseball player
Tim Collins − baseball player
Todd Collins − football player
Marc Colombo − football player
Tony Conigliaro (1945–1990) − baseball player
James Brendan Connolly – U.S. Olympic champion (triple jump)
Stephen Cooper − football player
Charlie Coyle − hockey player
Jim Craig − USA Olympic hockey player, 1980 Lake Placid
Honey Craven − equestrian
Candy Cummings − Hall of Fame baseball player
Tim Daggett − gymnast
Ron Darling − baseball pitcher, television commentator
Vinny Del Negro − basketball player, head coach
Tony DeMarco − welterweight champion boxer
Zak DeOssie − football player for New York Giants
Eli Dershwitz − Under-20 World Saber Champion, and US Olympic saber fencer
Mike DeVito − football player for Kansas City Chiefs
Oliver Drake − baseball pitcher
Rich Dubee − baseball coach
Leo Durocher − Hall of Fame baseball manager
Jack Eichel – hockey player
Mike Eruzione − USA Olympic hockey player, 1980 Lake Placid
Carl Etelman (1900–1963) - football back and coach
Patrick Ewing − Hall of Fame basketball player
Mark Fidrych − baseball pitcher, 1976 AL Rookie of the Year
Jake Fishman - American-Israeli baseball pitcher for the Miami Marlins and Team Israel
Ray Fitzgerald − baseball player
Kenny Florian − UFC Fighter
Doug Flutie − NFL quarterback, CFL Hall of Famer, Heisman Trophy winner
Nate Freiman (born 1986) − baseball player

G–L

Tony Gaffney (born 1984) – basketball player
Breno Giacomini − football player
Peter Giunta − football coach
Tom Glavine − Hall of Fame baseball pitcher
Jared Goldberg − Olympic skier
Billy Gonsalves – U.S. soccer player
Colin Grafton − figure skater
Kaz Grala – NASCAR driver
Frank Grant − Hall of Fame baseball player
Geoffrey Gray (born 1997) – American-Israeli professional basketball player 
Mike Grier − ice hockey player
Josh Grispi − WEC fighter
Matt Grzelcyk − hockey player
Bill Guerin − hockey player
Marvin Hagler (1954–2021) – middleweight champion boxer
Pete Hamilton − NASCAR driver 
Matt Hasselbeck − football player
Tim Hasselbeck − football player
Steve Hathaway − baseball pitcher
Steven Hauschka − football player
Ed Healey − NFL Hall of Fame player for Chicago Bears
Chris Herren − basketball player
Rich Hill − baseball pitcher
James Ihedigbo − football player
Tim Keefe − 19th-century baseball pitcher
Nancy Kerrigan − Olympic figure skater
Kofi Kingston − WWE wrestler
Joe Lauzon − UFC fighter
Peter Laviolette − hockey player, head coach
Erika Lawler − U.S Olympic women's hockey team
Michael Leach − tennis player
Dana LeVangie − baseball player, coach
Howie Long − Hall of Fame football player, sportscaster

M–R
Connie Mack − Hall of Fame baseball manager
Rabbit Maranville − Hall of Fame baseball player
Rocky Marciano − undefeated world heavyweight boxing champion
Obi Melifonwu − football player 
Lou Merloni − baseball player
Kristie Mewis – soccer player
Sam Mewis – soccer player
Mike Milbury − hockey player and coach
Wayne Millner − Hall of Fame football player and coach
 Ross Miner (born 1991) – skating coach and retired competitive figure skater
Joe Nash – football player
Sean Newcomb − basketball player
Nerlens Noel − basketball player
Ryan O'Rourke − baseball player
Rob Oppenheim − professional golfer
Francis Ouimet − golfer
Jay Pandolfo − hockey player
Bert Patenaude – U.S. soccer player (first hat-trick in the World Cup history)
Craig Patrick − hockey player
Carlos Peña − baseball player
Joe Philbin − football coach
Tom Poti − hockey player
John Quinlan − professional wrestler
 Joe Ragland (born 1989) – American-Liberian basketball player
Aly Raisman (born 1994) − Olympic gymnast
Jeff Reardon − baseball player
Jerry Remy − baseball player, broadcaster
Patrick Ricard − football player
Jorge Rivera − UFC fighter
Richard Rodgers II − football player
Jeremy Roenick − hockey player
Dan Ross − football player

S–Z
Joe Sacco − hockey player
Alicia Sacramone − Olympic gymnast
Sandy Saddler − champion boxer
 Alberto Salazar (born 1958) – distance runner and athletics coach banned for life
Keith Sanderson (born 1975) – sport shooter
Cory Schneider − hockey player
 Wayne Selden Jr. (born 1994) – basketball player
Anthony Sherman − NFL player
Simon Shnapir − Olympic medalist pairs skater
Jarrod Shoemaker − triathlete
 Jared Shuster (born 1998) − baseball pitcher
Jack Sharkey − world heavyweight boxing champion
John L. Sullivan − first world heavyweight boxing champion
 Harry Swartz (born 1996) - soccer player
Lofa Tatupu − football player
Jared Terrell (born 1995) - basketball player in the Israeli Basketball Premier League
John Thomas – U.S. Olympian (high jump)
Keith Tkachuk − hockey player
Jordan Todman − football player
Pie Traynor − Hall of Fame baseball player
Mark van Eeghen − football player
Jimmy Vesey − hockey player
Noah Vonleh − basketball player
Pete Walker − baseball pitcher, coach
Ben Wanger – American-Israeli baseball pitcher
Micky Ward − boxer
David Warsofsky − National Hockey League player
Turk Wendell − baseball pitcher
Jerry White − baseball player
Ryan Whitney − hockey player, Spittin' Chiclets podcast host
Jamila Wideman − female basketball player, lawyer and activist
Jermaine Wiggins − football player
Brian Wilson − baseball pitcher
Mark Wohlers − baseball pitcher
Wilbur Wood − baseball pitcher
Willy Workman (born 1990) − American-Israeli basketball player

Business

Sheldon Adelson − chief executive officer of Las Vegas Sands Corp.
Benjamin Bates IV − entrepreneur, namesake of Bates College
Michael Bloomberg − founder of Bloomberg L.P. and 108th Mayor of New York City (raised in Medford, Massachusetts)
Amar Bose − inventor
Horace Bowker (1877–1954) − farm economist and businessman
Edward Goodwin Burnham − industrialist, Connecticut state senator
Safra A. Catz − president of Oracle Corporation
John S. Chen − chief executive officer of BlackBerry Ltd.
Al Davis − former owner of the Oakland Raiders (deceased 2011)
Elias Hasket Derby − reportedly America's first millionaire
James Dole "Pineapple King" − founder of Dole Food Company
Dan Duquette − General Manager of the Baltimore Orioles
Thomas C. Durant − vice-president of the Union Pacific Railroad (1862-1870)
William C. Durant − founder of General Motors and Chevrolet
John Wesley Emerson − founder of the Emerson Electric Company
Theo Epstein − General Manager of the Chicago Cubs; previously with Boston Red Sox
Aaron Feuerstein − inventor
Dave Gettleman − General Manager of the Carolina Panthers
Crawford Greenewalt − president of DuPont (1948–1962)
Reed Hastings − chief executive officer of Netflix
Irwin M. Jacobs − co-founder and former chairman of Qualcomm
Howard Deering Johnson − founder of the Howard Johnson's chain
Leo Kahn − co-founder of Staples Inc.
Joseph P. Kennedy Sr. − businessman, investor, U.S. ambassador to United Kingdom
Robert Kraft − owner of the New England Patriots
Jesse Livermore – stock trader
Jeffrey Lurie − owner of the Philadelphia Eagles
Eunice Kennedy Shriver – founder of the Special Olympics; sister of President John F. Kennedy
George Swinnerton Parker − founder of Parker Brothers games
David Portnoy –  founder of Barstool Sports
Sumner Redstone − entertainment mogul
Henry Huttleston Rogers − industrialist
James Harris Simons − mathematician, billionaire hedge fund manager
Jes Staley − chief executive officer of Barclays
Kevin Systrom – co-founder and CEO of Instagram
Jack Welch − chief executive officer of General Electric (1981–2001)
Oliver Winchester − founder of the Winchester Repeating Arms Company
Robert Wolf − Chairman and CEO of UBS's Group Americas division

Civil rights leaders and political activists

Susan B. Anthony − social reformist, suffragist
David Bossie − political activist, president of Citizens United
Frederick Douglass − abolitionist, social reformist; lived in New Bedford and Lynn
W. E. B. Du Bois − civil rights activist, co-founder of the NAACP
Abby Kelley Foster − suffragist and abolitionist
Elizabeth Fox-Genovese − feminist historian and writer
Elizabeth Freeman − slave in Sheffield; sued for and won freedom on basis of state constitution, 1781
Margaret Fuller − journalist and suffragist
William Lloyd Garrison − abolitionist, journalist, and social reformist
William Henry Gove - Member of 1904 Massachusetts legislature; inventor of the Gove system of PR (see Single transferable voting)
Prince Hall − abolitionist and leader in the free black community in Boston
Abbie Hoffman − political activist, co-founder of the "Yippies"
Horace Mann − U.S. Congressman, educationist, and abolitionist
Nathaniel Raymond −  human rights investigator and anti-torture advocate
Lucy Stone − suffragist and abolitionist
Quock Walker − slave in Worcester County; won freedom on basis of state constitution, 1781
Malcolm X − civil rights activist; spent adolescence in Roxbury

Crime

Elizabeth Borden − murderer, acquitted
James J. "Whitey" Bulger − mobster, leader of Winter Hill Gang
Albert DeSalvo "Boston Strangler" − criminal
Thomas DeSimone − gangster
"Anthony the Animal" Fiato − mobster
Stephen "The Rifleman" Flemmi − gangster
Jimmy Flynn − mobster, actor
Mark Foley − U.S. Congressman, criminal
David Gilbert − radical activist
George "Boston George" Jung − drug trafficker, smuggler
Bernard "Bernie" McLaughlin − gangster
Edward "Punchy" McLaughlin − gangster
James "Buddy" McLean − mobster
James "Spike" O'Toole − mobster
Jacob D. Robida − neo-Nazi, criminal
"Handsome Johnny" Roselli − mobster for the Chicago Outfit
Frank Salemme − mobster, hitman
Frank Wallace − gangster
Howie Winter − mobster
Nathaniel Bar-Jonah − convicted child molester, suspected serial killer and cannibal
Nicola Sacco and Bartolomeo Vanzetti –  Italian immigrants who were defendants in a controversial murder trial for an armed robbery of a shoe company in Braintree, Massachusetts

Entertainment

Comedians
Edwin Adams – comedian, stage actor
Orny Adams – comedian, actor, Teen Wolf
Fred Allen – radio comedian
Anthony Barbieri –  comedy writer and performer, Jimmy Kimmel Live!
Mike Birbiglia –  comedian
Andrew Bowen –  comedian, MADtv
Bo Burnham –  comedian
Bill Burr –  comedian, actor
Louis C.K. –  comedian, actor, director, Louie
Bryan Callen –  comedian, actor
Mario Cantone –  comedian
Steve Carell –  comedian, actor, The Office
Robert Carlock –  producer, writer, 30 Rock
Jessica Chaffin –  comedian and actor, The Heat
Lenny Clarke –  comedian and actor, Rescue Me
Jerry Colonna –  comedian, singer
Dane Cook –  comedian and actor; Retaliation, Harmful If Swallowed (Arlington)
Nate Corddry –  comedian, actor, The Daily Show
Rob Corddry –  comedian, actor, The Daily Show with Jon Stewart
Rob Delaney –  comedian, writer
Jamie Denbo –  comedian, actress, Terriers
Nick DiPaolo –  comedian
Rachel Dratch –  comedian, Saturday Night Live
John Ennis –  comedian, actor, Mr. Show with Bob and David
Spike Feresten –  comedy writer, television personality
Christian Finnegan –  comedian, actor, Are We There Yet?
Gary Gulman –  comedian
Pete Holmes –  comedian, comedy writer, television personality, voice-over actor
Penn Jillette –  comedian, illusionist, juggler, writer
Mindy Kaling –  comedian, actress The Office US, The Mindy Project
Robert Kelly –  comedian, actor, NYC 22
Jen Kirkman –  comedian, actress, writer, SuperNews!
John Krasinski –  comedian, actor The Office US
Denis Leary –  comedian and actor
Jay Leno –  comedian and talk show host
Jason Mantzoukas –  comedian and writer, The League
Matt Mira –  comedian, writer, and podcaster
Eugene Mirman –  comedian and writer, Bob's Burgers
B. J. Novak –  comedian, actor, head writer of The Office US
Conan O'Brien –  comedian and talk show host (Cambridge)
Patrice O'Neal –  comedian, writer
John Pinette –  comedian, actor
Amy Poehler –  comedian, actress, Parks and Recreation
Paula Poundstone –  comedian
Joe Rogan –  comedian, actor
Faith Salie –  comedian, actress, radio host, Significant Others
Frankie Saluto – circus performer, professional clown
Lew Schneider –  comedian, actor, writer, Everybody Loves Raymond
Matt Selman –  writer, producer, The Simpsons
Tom Shillue –  comedian, host of Red Eye
Jenny Slate –  comedian, actress, Saturday Night Live
Doug Stanhope –  comedian
Steve Sweeney –  comedian and actor
Jimmy Tingle –  comedian and actor
Nancy Walls –  comedian, actress
Steven Wright –  comedian, actor (Burlington)

Television and film
A–H
Ben Affleck –  Oscar-winning screenwriter, director and actor; Good Will Hunting, Argo (Berkeley, California)
Casey Affleck –  actor (Falmouth), Oscar-winning actor, Manchester by the Sea
Jack Albertson –  Oscar-winning actor
Jane Alexander –  Emmy and Tony Award-winning actress
Kristian Alfonso –  actress
Christopher Allport –  actor
Shawn Andrews –  actor
John Ashton –  actor
Elizabeth Banks –  actress
Susan Batson –  actress, producer
Michael Beach –  actor
Tobin Bell –  actor
Paul Benedict –  actor
H. Jon Benjamin –  voice actor; Bob's Burgers, Archer (Worcester)
Traci Bingham –  actress, model
Connie Britton – actress
Vail Bloom –  actress
Verna Bloom –  actress
Eric Bogosian –  actor, playwright; Law & Order: Criminal Intent, Talk Radio (Woburn)
Ray Bolger –  actor
Walter Brennan –  Academy Award-winning actor
Paget Brewster –  actress
Clarence Brown –  director
Phil Brown –  actor
Wally Brown –  actor
Jere Burns –  actor
Steve Carell –  actor, The Office, The 40-Year-Old Virgin (Acton)
Richard Carle –  actor
Corey Carrier –  actor
Max Casella –  actor
Peggy Cass –  actress, television personality
John Cazale –  actor
John Cena –  actor and WWE Champion (West Newbury)
Kevin Chapman –  actor
Michael Chiklis –  actor
Etan Cohen –  screenwriter
Misha Collins –  actor
Jennifer Coolidge –  actress
Nate Corddry –  actor, The Daily Show with Jon Stewart, Studio 60 (Weymouth)
Rob Corddry –  The Daily Show with Jon Stewart, (Weymouth)
Marcia Cross –  Desperate Housewives (Marlborough)
Monique Gabriela Curnen –  actress
Jane Curtin –  actress
Matt Damon –  Academy Award-winning screenwriter and actor; Good Will Hunting, The Bourne Identity, The Departed (Cambridge)
Bette Davis –  actress
Geena Davis –  Academy Award-winning actress; Thelma and Louise (Wareham)
Billy De Wolfe –  actor, comedian, singer, voice actor Frosty the Snowman
Ken Doane –  wrestler (Worcester)
Ed Donovan –  Monster, Acts of Mercy (South Boston)
Jeffrey Donovan –  actor; Burn Notice (Amesbury)
Illeana Douglas –  actress
Rachel Dratch –  actress, Saturday Night Live (Lexington)
Anne Dudek –  actress
Olympia Dukakis –  Academy Award-winning actress
Eliza Dushku –  actress
Richard Dysart –  actor
Lisa Edelstein –  actress
Ben Edlund –  producer, writer
Charles H. Eglee –  Emmy Award-winning producer and writer
Lee Eisenberg –  producer, writer
John Enos III –  actor
Kathryn Erbe –  actress
Chris Evans –  actor 
Scott Evans – actor
Charles Farrell –  actor
Guy Ferland –  film and television director
Betty Field –  actress
Alison Folland –  actress
Ben Foster –  actor
Arlene Francis –  actress
Samuel Fuller –  director, screenwriter
Sabina Gadecki –  model, actress
Christos Gage –  screenwriter
Pamela Gidley –  actress
Paul Michael Glaser –  actor, director
Nick Gomez –  director
Ruth Gordon –  actress
Joey Graceffa –  YouTube personality, actor
Sprague Grayden –  actress
Ari Graynor –  actress
Adam Green –  actor, director, screenwriter
Lynnie Greene –  actress, writer, producer
Clark Gregg –  actor, screenwriter
Scott Grimes, actor
Paul Guilfoyle –  actor
Jack Haley –  actor
Anthony Michael Hall –  actor
Pooch Hall –  actor
Neil Hamilton –  actor
Jane Hamsher –  film producer
Van Hansis –  actor
G Hannelius –  actress
Jay Harrington –  actor
Jesse Heiman –  actor
John Michael Higgins –  actor
Nichole Hiltz –  actress
Marin Hinkle –  actress
Judith Hoag –  actress
John Hodgman –  The Daily Show, "I'm a PC" in Get a Mac (Brookline)
Hal Holbrook –  actor

I–P
Julia Jones – actress
Marie Jansen –  musical actress
Ann Jillian –  actress
Amy Jo Johnson – actress
Chris J. Johnson –  actor
JoJo –  actress, singer
Jennifer Jostyn –  actress
Madeline Kahn –  actress, singer
Mindy Kaling –  actress, Inside Out, The Mindy Project (Cambridge)
Ben Karlin –  comedian, The Daily Show with Jon Stewart, The Colbert Report (Needham)
Joe Keery –  actor, Stranger Things
David E. Kelley –  Emmy Award-winning writer and producer
Jean Louisa Kelly –  actress
Arthur Kennedy –  actor
The Klimaszewski Twins –  models, actresses
John Krasinski –  actor, The Office (Newton)
Ben Kurland –  The Artist (Newton)
Denis Leary –  actor, Rescue Me, A Bug's Life, Ice Age (Worcester)
Matt LeBlanc –  actor, Friends (Newton)
Rex Lee –  actor
Jack Lemmon –  Academy Award-winning actor
Jay Leno –  comedian and host, The Tonight Show (Andover)
Joseph E. Levine –  producer
Richard Libertini –  actor
Laura Linney –  actress (Northfield Mount Hermon School)
Alexander Mackendrick –  director
Rob Mariano –  Survivor contestant
Nora Marlowe –  actor
Erica McDermott –  actress
Neal McDonough –  actor
Richard McGonagle –  actor
Melinda McGraw –  actress
Ed McMahon –  television personality, The Tonight Show Starring Johnny Carson, Star Search (Lowell)
Terrence E. McNally –  actor
Julie McNiven –  actress
Maria Menounos –  Entertainment Tonight, Extra (Medford)
Jan Miner –  actress
Eugene Mirman –  voice actor
William Monahan –  screenwriter
Agnes Moorehead –  Emmy Award-winning actress
David Morse –  actor
Robert Morse –  actor, singer
Ebon Moss-Bachrach –  actor
Bridget Moynahan –  actress
Peter Murnik –  actor
Donna Murphy –  actress
Alexandra Neil –  actress
Barry Newman –  actor
Julianne Nicholson –  actress
Leonard Nimoy –  actor, Star Trek, IMAX voiceover (Boston)
Alessandro Nivola –  actor
Lance Norris –  actor, The Judge (Cohasset)
Edward Norton –  actor, American History X, The Incredible Hulk (Boston)
B. J. Novak –  actor, The Office (Newton)
Conan O'Brien –  television personality, Late Night with Conan O'Brien (Brookline)
Tricia O'Kelley –  actress
Gretchen Palmer –  actress
Benjamin John Parrillo –  actor
Estelle Parsons –  Academy Award-winning actress
Adrian Pasdar –  actor
Elizabeth Perkins –  actress
John Bennett Perry –  actor
Matthew Perry –  actor
Rebecca Pidgeon –  actress
Joseph Pilato –  actor
Maryann Plunkett –  actress
Amy Poehler –  actress, Saturday Night Live, Inside Out (Burlington)
Ellen Pompeo –  Old School, Grey's Anatomy (Everett)
Robert Preston –  actor

Q–Z
Alan Rachins –  actor
Natalie Ramsey –  actress
Kim Raver –  actress (Northfield Mount Hermon School)
Joseph D. Reitman –  actor
James Remar –  actor
Patrick Renna – actor
Robert Richardson –  Academy Award-winning cinematographer
Alex Rocco –  actor
Eli Roth –  director, screenwriter, actor; Hostel (Newton)
Harold Russell –  Academy Award-winning actor
Kurt Russell –  actor, Escape from New York (Springfield)
Damien Sandow –  born Aaron Haddad, professional wrestler
Taylor Schilling –  actress
Fred J. Scollay –  actor
Tom Everett Scott –  actor
John Slattery –  actor
Hillary B. Smith –  actress
Paul L. Smith –  actor
Talisa Soto –  actress
James Spader –  Emmy Award-winning actor; The Blacklist, Boston Legal (Boston)
Caroll Spinney –  puppeteer of Big Bird and Oscar the Grouch on Sesame Street
Andrew Stanton –  director, screenwriter, producer
David Starzyk –  actor
Skipp Sudduth –  actor
Erik Per Sullivan –  actor
Liam Kyle Sullivan –  the "Kelly" Skits (Boston)
Julie Taymor –  director
Casey Patrick Tebo –  director
Robin Thomas –  actor
Uma Thurman –  actress, Pulp Fiction, Kill Bill (Amherst)
T. J. Thyne –  actor
Maura Tierney –  actress
Nancy Travis –  actress
Jonathan Tucker –  actor
Paige Turco –  actress
Anne Twomey –  actress
Steven Tyler –  actor, musician, TV personality (Lynn, Marshfield)
Steven Van Zandt –  actor
Donnie Wahlberg –  actor and musician
Mark Wahlberg –  actor, musician, producer; Entourage, The Departed, Ted (Dorchester)
Nancy Walls –  actress, Saturday Night Live, The Office (Cohasset)
Barbara Walters –  television journalist and personality (Boston)
Sam Waterston –  actor
William A. Wellman –  Academy Award-winning director
Lyle R. Wheeler –  Academy Award-winning art director (Woburn)
Brian J. White –  actor, dancer
Kristen Wilson –  actress
Alicia Witt –  actress (Worcester)
Kenny Wormald –  dancer, actor
George Wyner –  actor
Greg Yaitanes –  director
Michael Yebba –  actor, screenwriter
Rob Zombie –  director, screenwriter, The Devil's Rejects (Haverhill)

Radio
Dean Barnett –  occasional fill-in radio host for Hugh Hewitt
Liane Hansen –  senior host of NPR's Weekend Edition Sunday
Ray and Tom Magliozzi –  of Car Talk
Leslie Marshall –  radio talk host
Henry Joseph Nasiff Jr. –  former Howard Stern Show regular
Ryen Russillo –  sports radio host
Paul Sullivan –  radio talk host

Hosts, sportscasters, and television personalities
Tom Bergeron –  television personality and game show host
Michelle Bonner –  ESPN SportsCenter and ESPNEWS anchor
Susie Castillo –  MTV VJ and 2003 Miss USA
Liz Claman –  anchor for Fox Business Network's Countdown to the Closing Bell
Bertha Coombs –  general assignment reporter for CNBC
S. E. Cupp –  conservative pundit and Crossfire panelist
Fred Cusick –  play-by-play announcer for the Boston Bruins
Arwa Damon –  video correspondent for CNN International and CNN based in Iraq
Damien Fahey –  MTV VJ
Josh Gates –  explorer and host of Destination Truth on Syfy network
Ed Herlihy –  radio and television announcer
John King –  CNN chief national correspondent
Steve Kornacki –  political commentator on MSNBC and host of Up
Wayne Larrivee –  play-by-play announcer for the Green Bay Packers; previously for the Chicago Bears
Josh Lewin –  play-by-play announcer for the Texas Rangers
Sean McDonough –  sports announcer for ESPN
Maria Menounos –  television presenter for Entertainment Tonight and Access Hollywood
Katie Nolan –  Emmy-winning television host for Fox Sports 1
Dave O'Brien –  ESPN sportscaster
Lawrence O'Donnell –  political commentator on MSNBC and host of The Last Word
Don Orsillo –  play-by-play announcer for the San Diego Padres
Gil Santos –  WBZ, voice of the New England Patriots
John Sencio –  host of Cash In The Attic for HGTV, MTV VJ during the 1990s, actor and musician
George Stephanopoulos –  chief political correspondent for ABC News, co-anchor of Good Morning America
Lesley Visser –  sportscaster, Boston Globe sportswriter, co-host of The NFL Today
Suzyn Waldman –  sportscaster for WCBS-AM and color commentator for the New York Yankees
Mike Wallace –  television personality and journalist, 60 Minutes correspondent

Early settlers/colonists
Dorcas ye blackmore – one of the first African Americans to settle in New England
Elizabeth Poole – founder of Taunton, in 1637; the first woman to have founded a town in the Americas
Jonas Rice – first permanent settler and founder of Worcester
John Murray – Athol
Joseph Hull – Barnstable
Roger Conant – credited with establishing the communities of Salem, Peabody, and Danvers

Literature, journalism, and philosophy

Francis Ellingwood Abbot – philosopher and theologian
Herbert Baxter Adams – educator, historian
Mary Hall Adams – editor, letter writer
Amanda L. Aikens – editor, philanthropist 	
Louisa May Alcott – author, Little Women (Concord)
Emily Gillmore Alden – educator, author
Lucy Morris Chaffee Alden – author, hymnwriter	
Susannah Valentine Aldrich – author, hymnwriter	
Horatio Alger Jr. – author
Sarah Louise Arnold - educator, textbook author
Amelia Atwater-Rhodes – author, In the Forests of the Night, Demon in my View (Concord)
Martha Violet Ball – educator, philanthropist, activist, writer, editor
Mike Barnicle – journalist
Clara Bancroft Beatley - educator, lecturer, author
Catharine Webb Barber – newspaper editor, author 	
Peter Beinart – journalist (Cambridge)
Edward Bellamy – author and socialist
Amalie Benjamin – journalist, The Boston Globe
James Bennet – editor-in-chief of The Atlantic
Ella A. Bigelow – author, clubwoman
Lettie S. Bigelow — poet and author
Elizabeth Bishop – poet (Worcester)
Mary Agnes Dalrymple Bishop – journalist, newspaper editor	
Benjamin C. Bradlee – Editor-in-chief and Vice President of the Washington Post, author, journalist
Anne Bradstreet – poet
Joseph Breck – author, magazine editor, publisher (Medfield)
Howard Bryant – sports journalist for ESPN
William Cullen Bryant – poet
Clara Louise Burnham – novelist
Augusten Burroughs – Running with Scissors (Amherst)
Robert Ellis Cahill – sheriff, politician, folklorist, author, some three dozen books on New England history and lore (Salem)
John Casey – author
Mary Bassett Clarke – writer
Helen Field Comstock – poet, philanthropist 
Harriet Abbott Lincoln Coolidge – author, philanthropist, reformer 	
Robert Cormier – author, columnist (Leominster)
Bernard Cornwell – created Richard Sharpe (Chatham)
Sibylla Bailey Crane – educator, composer, writer	
Robert Creeley – poet (Arlington, Acton)
E. E. Cummings – poet (Cambridge)
Martha E. Sewall Curtis – suffragist, writer 	
Steve Curwood – journalist, author (Boston)
Cora Linn Daniels – author	
Stephen Daye – printer
Donald Davidson – philosopher
Emily Dickinson – poet (Amherst)
E. J. Dionne – liberal op-ed columnist for The Washington Post (Boston)
W. E. B. Du Bois – author, editor, historian, The Souls of Black Folk (Great Barrington)
Andre Dubus III – author
Will Durant – writer, historian, philosopher (North Adams)
Mary F. Eastman – educator, writer, suffragist 
Gordon Edes – sports journalist
Dave Eggers – author
Ralph Waldo Emerson – poet, Nature, The Transcendentalist (Concord)
Lizzie P. Evans-Hansell – novelist, short story writer	
Jessie Forsyth - newspaper editor, temperance advocate
Harriet Putnam Fowler – author, poet 	
George Frazier – journalist (Boston)
Robert Frost – poet (Lawrence)
Linda Gaboriau – dramaturg and literary translator (Boston)
Nicholas Gage – writer and journalist (Worcester)
John Kenneth Galbraith – author, educator, and public official
Peter Gammons – sportswriter (Boston)
Anna Gardner – abolitionist, poet
Khalil Gibran – artist, poet, writer
George Gilder – author, intellectual (Tyringham)
Ellen Goodman – journalist, syndicated columnist
Edward Gorey – author and illustrator
Cynthia Roberts Gorton – poet, author	
Hattie Tyng Griswold – writer, poet 	
Lucie Caroline Hager – author
Mary Whitwell Hale – hymnwriter
Nathaniel Hawthorne – author, The Scarlet Letter (Salem)
Eliza Putnam Heaton – journalist, editor
Nat Hentoff – historian, novelist, music critic (Boston)
Grace Hibbard, writer, poet 
George V. Higgins – columnist, author, The Friends of Eddie Coyle
M. E. Hirsh – novelist
Louise Manning Hodgkins – educator, author, editor 
Oliver Wendell Holmes, Sr. – poet and essayist (Cambridge)
Lucy Hooper – poet
Helen Maria Hunt Jackson – author
Katharine Johnson Jackson – physician, writer
Charlotte A. Jerauld – poet, writer
S. O. Johnson – author 
Rebecca Richardson Joslin – writer, lecturer, benefactor, clubwoman
Sebastian Junger – author, journalist
Janice Kaplan – novelist, magazine editor 
Marina Keegan – author, playwright (Wayland)
Jack Kerouac – author, On the Road (Lowell)
Ronald Kessler – journalist, author, In the President's Secret Service (Belmont)
Richard Kindleberger – reporter, editor, The Boston Globe (Lincoln)
Peter King – sportswriter, author
Jonathan Kozol – author, educator, activist
Stanley Kunitz – poet, Poet Laureate of the United States (Worcester)
Peter Laird – comic book creator of the Teenage Mutant Ninja Turtles
Timothy Leary – psychologist, author, Turn On, Tune In, Drop Out (Springfield)
Dennis Lehane – author
Mark Leibovich – journalist and author, The New Imperialists (Boston)
Henry Cabot Lodge – author and public official
Henry Wadsworth Longfellow (1807–1882) – author
Amy Lowell – Pulitzer Prize-winning poet
James Russell Lowell – poet (Fireside Poets)
Robert Lowell – poet
Hannah Lyman – biographer
Michael Patrick MacDonald – author, activist, All Souls (South Boston)
William Manchester – author and biographer
William Marston – comic book writer, co-created Wonder Woman
Tony Massarotti – sportswriter, The Boston Globe (Waltham)
Stephen McCauley – The Object of My Affection (Woburn)
Will McDonough – sportswriter for the Boston Globe (South Boston)
Eileen McNamara – columnist, The Boston Globe (Cambridge)
Susan Minot – novelist, short story writer (Boston, Manchester)
Robin Moore – author, The Green Berets (Boston)
Mary L. Moreland – minister, evangelist, suffragist, author	
Orson Desaix Munn – publisher of Scientific American (Monson)
Marvin Olasky – author, editor-in-chief of WORLD Magazine
Grace A. Oliver – author, social reformer
Charles Olson – poet (Worcester)
Robert B. Parker – author (Springfield)
Annie Stevens Perkins – writer	
Bliss Perry – literary critic, writer, editor (Williamstown)
Maude Gillette Phillips – author, educator
Charlie Pierce – sportswriter, political blogger, author 
Daniel Pipes – author, In the Path of God (Boston, Cambridge)
Eliza A. Pittsinger – poet 
Sylvia Plath – poet, author, and essayist, The Bell Jar (Boston)
Edgar Allan Poe – author and poet, "The Raven", "The Fall of the House of Usher" (Boston)
Cora Scott Pond Pope –  pageant writer, suffragist
Rufus Porter – founder of Scientific American magazine (Boxford)
Douglas Preston – author, The Book of the Dead (Cambridge)
Dora Knowlton Ranous – actress, author, editor, translator
Jane Maria Read – poet	
John Rennie – editor-in-chief of Scientific American magazine
Bob Ryan – sportswriter for The Boston Globe
R.A. Salvatore – author (Leominster)
George Santayana – philosopher, essayist, poet, novelist, The Life of Reason (Boston)
Caroline M. Sawyer – poet, biographer, editor
Daniel Scott – author, Some of Us Have to Get Up in the Morning, Pay This Amount (Braintree)
Horace Scudder – man of letters, editor
Dr. Seuss – born Theodor Seuss Geisel, author, poet and illustrator (Springfield)
Anne Sexton – poet (Newton)
Mark Shasha – author
Harriette R. Shattuck – writer, suffragist 	
Dan Shaughnessy – sportswriter (Groton)
Anita Shreve – author
Kyle Smith – film critic, novelist, essayist
Jeff Stein – columnist
Jane Agnes Stewart (1860-1944) — author, editor, and contributor to periodicals
Lothrop Stoddard – political scientist, historian, journalist, anthropologist, eugenicist
Clara Harrison Stranahan – author
Lucy Switzer – social activist, writer
Sabrina Tavernise – journalist (Granville)
Michelle Tea – Rent Girl (Chelsea)
Henry David Thoreau – philosopher, author, Walden (Concord)
Eliza Townsend – poet
John Updike – author
Annie Russell Wall — historian, writer, teacher
Julia Rush Cutler Ward – occasional poet
Lillie Eginton Warren – educator, author
Anna Cabot Quincy Waterston – writer
Edith Wharton – author
Phillis Wheatley – first African-American woman to publish a book of poetry
John Greenleaf Whittier – poet and abolitionist
Celeste M. A. Winslow – author
Susan H. Wixon – author, editor, feminist	
Thomas E. Woods Jr. – author, historian (North Andover)
Jane Yolen – author

Military

Clarence Lionel Adcock – US Army, deputy to General Lucius D. Clay in 1946
Nathaniel M. Allen – soldier in Civil War, awarded Medal of Honor
George Bancroft – Secretary of the Navy and founder of the US Naval Academy
Timothy Bigelow – Revolutionary War patriot
William Francis Buckley – US Army officer and CIA operative; died in 1985 while being tortured by the Islamist group Hezbollah
William Harvey Carney – African-American soldier in Civil War
George W. Casey Jr. – US Army general and Chief of Staff of the United States Army
Christopher Cassidy – US Navy SEAL, NASA astronaut
 David Cohen (1917–2020) – member of the US Army, a liberator of the Ohrdruf concentration camp, and a schoolteacher
Joseph Dunford – US Marine Corps general, Chairman of the Joint Chiefs of Staff under Barack Obama
John Wesley Emerson – Civil War commander
General John Galvin – retired US Army; former dean of The Fletcher School at Tufts University
Adolphus Greely – Polar explorer, US Army officer and recipient of the Medal of Honor
Joseph Hooker – commander of the Army of the Potomac in the Civil War 
Cyprian Howe (1726–1806) – colonel in the American Revolutionary War
Joseph P. Kennedy Jr. – US Navy lieutenant, killed in action during World War II
Henry Knox – officer in the Continental Army, 1st United States Secretary of War
Barry McCaffrey – four-star Army General, Director of the Office of National Drug Control Policy
George Patton IV (1923–2004) – major general in the U.S. Army
Israel Putnam – major general in the American Revolutionary War
Elmer J. Rogers Jr. (1903–2002) – United States Air Force lieutenant general
Andrew Jackson Smith – African-American soldier in the Civil War
Robert Gould Shaw – US officer in Union Army, commanded the 54th Massachusetts Infantry Regiment
Charles Pomeroy Stone – soldier, explorer, and engineer
Ralph Talbot (1897–1918) – US Marine Corps pilot during World War I, Medal of Honor
Steven N. Wickstrom – Army National Guard major general who commanded the 42nd Infantry Division

Music

Classical music 
John Coolidge Adams (born 1947) – composer (contemporary classical with strong roots in minimalism)
Samuel Adler – composer and conductor, lived and studied for a time in Massachusetts before moving to New York
Leroy Anderson (1908–1975) – composer of short, light concert pieces
Leonard Bernstein – conductor, composer, author, music lecturer and pianist of Ukrainian Jewish descent
Sarah Caldwell (1924–2006) – opera conductor, impresario and stage director of opera
Michael Gandolfi – composer of contemporary classical music
Serge Koussevitzky (Russian: Сергей Александрович Кусевицкий) – born in Russia, composer and conductor Boston Symphony Orchestra; professor to Leonard Bernstein, Samuel Adler and Sarah Caldwell
Walter Piston (1894–1976) – composer, music theorist and professor of Italian-American descent
Roger Sessions (Roger Huntington Sessions, 1896–1985) – composer, critic and teacher
Randall Thompson (1899–1984) – composer of choral works

Other music 
Akrobatik – rapper
Bell Biv Devoe – R&B group
Nuno Bettencourt – singer and guitarist of Extreme
Tracy Bonham – alternative rock musician
Bobby Brown – singer
Michael Burkett (also known as Fat Mike) – singer, bassist of NOFX and owner of Fat Wreck Chords, born in Massachusetts
Gary Cherone – rock singer and songwriter
Roderick Chisholm – philosopher
Neil Cicierega – singer and internet cult icon
Ray Conniff – easy-listening recording artist
Cousin Stizz – rapper, Dorchester
Sibylla Bailey Crane - art song composer
Rich Cronin – singer, LFO
Danny Davis – country musician
Brad Delp – lead singer of former bands Boston, RTZ
Nicole Fiorentino –  bass guitarist of The Smashing Pumpkins
John Flansburgh – half of They Might Be Giants
Thom Gimbel – rhythm guitar, saxophone, flute, keyboards, vocals for Foreigner
Barry Goudreau – guitars, backing vocals for Boston, RTZ, Ernie and the Automatics
Norman Greenbaum – singer
Tom Hamilton – bassist for Aerosmith
Kay Hanley – singer (Letters to Cleo)
Sib Hashian – drums, percussion, backing vocals for Boston, RTZ, Ernie and the Automatics
Juliana Hatfield – guitarist, singer-songwriter
Roy Haynes – jazz musician
Pete Francis Heimbold – Dispatch member
JoJo – singer
Sonya Kitchell – singer-songwriter
Joey Kramer – drummer for Aerosmith
Jordan Knight – singer-songwriter
Phil Labonte – singer, All That Remains
Jack Landrón – folk singer-songwriter
Aaron Lewis – lead vocalist and rhythm guitarist of Staind
John Linnell – one half of They Might Be Giants
Mary Lou Lord – singer, guitarist
Joyner Lucas – rapper
Taj Mahal – blues musician
J Mascis – singer-songwriter, guitarist for Dinosaur Jr
Jonah Matranga – singer-songwriter
Andrew McMahon – singer, pianist
Jo Dee Messina – country artist
Angie Miller – singer- songwriter
Matt Nathanson - singer-songwriter
Mike Ness – guitarist, vocalist, songwriter for Social Distortion
Taecyeon Ok – actor, model, and member of South Korean pop group 2PM
Moriah Rose Pereira (Poppy) – musician and YouTube personality
Paul Pena – singer-songwriter and guitarist 
Joe Perry – guitarist, singer for Aerosmith, The Joe Perry Project
Linda Perry – singer-songwriter
Bobby "Boris" Pickett – singer ("Monster Mash")
Rachel Platten – singer-songwriter 
Ruth Pointer – singer-songwriter of the Pointer Sisters
Alisan Porter – singer-songwriter and retired actress; winner of The Voice season 10
Jonathan Richman – singer-songwriter in The Modern Lovers
David Robinson – drummer, The Cars
Tom Scholz – musician, composer for the band Boston
Carly Simon – musician, singer, composer
Slaine – hip-hop MC
Spider One – singer
Billy Squier – rock musician
Quinn Sullivan – guitarist, singer
Donna Summer – singer-songwriter
James Taylor – singer-songwriter, instrumentalist
Meghan Trainor – singer-songwriter
Chad Stokes Urmston – Dispatch member
Brad Whitford – singer, guitarist for Aerosmith
Alan Wilson – guitarist and singer for the band Canned Heat
Rob Zombie – singer, director
Maia Reficco – singer

Native Americans

King Philip – war chief (Wampanoag)
Crispus Attucks (see below)
Samoset – first Native American to make contact with the Pilgrims (Abenaki)
Squanto – helped the Pilgrims in their first visit to the New World (Wampanoag)
Caleb Cheeshahteaumuck – first Native American graduate of Harvard University (Wampanoag)
Passaconaway – Chief of the Pennacook tribe (Pennacook)
Massasoit – Chief of the Wampanoag tribe in 1621 (Wampanoag)

People involved in the American Revolution

John Adams – patriot; 2nd President and 1st Vice President of the United States
Samuel Adams – 4th Governor of Massachusetts and Delegate to the Continental Congress
Crispus Attucks – first casualty of the American Revolutionary War
Edward Bancroft – physician and spy for both the U.S. and Britain during the Revolution
Timothy Bigelow – patriot, colonel of the 15th Massachusetts Regiment of the Continental Army
Benjamin Church – first Surgeon General of the United States Army
Isaac Davis – commanded Minutemen during Battles of Lexington and Concord, logo of the National Guard
Thomas Dawes – colonel in Massachusetts militia
William Dawes – rode with Paul Revere during "Midnight Ride"
William Eustis – physician, military surgeon at Battle of Bunker Hill, 12th Governor of Massachusetts
John Glover – Brigadier General in the Continental Army
John Hancock – 1st and 3rd Governor of Massachusetts and President of the Continental Congress
James Otis – lawyer; known for his catchphrase "No taxation without representation"
Robert Treat Paine – signer of the Declaration of Independence and 1st Attorney General of Massachusetts
John Parker – farmer, minuteman during the Battles of Lexington and Concord
Samuel Prescott – only participant of "Midnight Ride" to reach Concord
William Prescott – Colonel during the Battle of Bunker Hill
Josiah Quincy II – Boston lawyer
Paul Revere – silversmith; patriot; known for his "Midnight Ride"
Deborah Sampson – disguised herself as a man in the Continental Army
Artemus Ward – Major general in the American Revolution; Congressman from Massachusetts
Joseph Warren – physician; President of the Massachusetts Provincial Congress
Mercy Otis Warren – political writer and propagandist of the American Revolution

Politics and government

Presidents
John Adams (1735–1826) – 2nd President of the United States
John Quincy Adams (1767–1848) – 6th President of the United States
George H. W. Bush (1924–2018) – 41st President of the United States
Calvin Coolidge (1872–1933) – 30th President of the United States
John F. Kennedy (1917–1963) – 35th President of the United States

Vice Presidents
 John Adams (1735–1826) – 1st Vice President of the United States
 George H. W. Bush (1924–2018) – 43rd Vice President of the United States
 Calvin Coolidge (1872–1933) – 29th Vice President of the United States
Elbridge Gerry (1744–1814) – 5th Vice President of the United States (namesake of gerrymandering)
Henry Wilson (1812–1875) – 18th Vice President of the United States

Governors

Samuel Adams (1722–1803) – 4th Governor of Massachusetts and Delegate to the Continental Congress
Charlie Baker (born 1956) – 72nd Governor of Massachusetts (incumbent)
James Bowdoin (1726–1790) – 2nd Governor of Massachusetts
Paul Cellucci (1948–2013) – 69th Governor of Massachusetts and U.S. Ambassador to Canada
James Michael Curley (1874–1958) – 35th Mayor of Boston and 53rd Governor of Massachusetts
 Calvin Coolidge (1872–1933) – 48th Governor of Massachusetts
Michael Dukakis (born 1933) – 65th and 67th Governor of Massachusetts and 1988 Democratic presidential nominee
Edward Everett (1794–1865) – 15th Governor of Massachusetts; U.S. Secretary of State; remembered for his two-hour speech at Gettysburg
Elbridge Gerry (1744–1814) – 9th Governor of Massachusetts
John Hancock (1737–1793) – 1st and 3rd Governor of Massachusetts and President of the Continental Congress
Thomas Hutchinson (1711–1780) – Colonial Governor
Levi Lincoln Sr. (1749–1820) – U.S. Attorney General, U.S. Secretary of State and Governor of Massachusetts (acting)
Deval Patrick (born 1956) – 71st Governor of Massachusetts
Mitt Romney (born 1947) – 70th Governor of Massachusetts, 2012 Republican presidential nominee
Jane Swift (born 1965) – first and only female Governor of Massachusetts (acting)
John A. Volpe (1908–1994) – U.S. Secretary of Transportation under President Nixon and 61st and 63rd Governor of Massachusetts
David I. Walsh (1872–1947) – U.S. Senator and 46th Governor of Massachusetts
Bill Weld (born 1945) – 68th Governor of Massachusetts, 2016 Libertarian Vice-Presidential nominee

United States Senators

Edward Brooke (1919–2015) – U.S. Senator from Massachusetts; first African-American popularly elected to the Senate
Henry L. Dawes (1816–1903) – U.S. Senator from Massachusetts; notable for the Dawes Act
Paul Douglas (1892–1976) – U.S. Senator from Illinois (born in Salem, Massachusetts)
 John F. Kennedy (1917–1963) – U.S. Senator and Congressman from Massachusetts 
Robert F. Kennedy (1925–1968) – U.S. Attorney General and U.S. Senator from New York (born in Brookline, Massachusetts)
Ted Kennedy (1932–2009) – longtime U.S. Senator from Massachusetts 
John Kerry (born 1943) – U.S. Senator from Massachusetts, U.S. Secretary of State, and 2004 Democratic presidential nominee
Henry Cabot Lodge (1850–1924) – U.S. Senator from Massachusetts, led the Senate opposition to the League of Nations
Henry Cabot Lodge Jr. (1902–1985) – U.S. Senator Massachusetts and 1960 Republican vice-presidential nominee 
Ed Markey (born 1946) – U.S. Senator from Massachusetts (incumbent) and former Congressman
Warren Rudman (1930–2012) – U.S. Senator from New Hampshire (born in Boston)
Leverett Saltonstall (1892–1979) – U.S. Senator (Minority Whip) and 55th Governor of Massachusetts
Theodore Sedgwick (1746–1813) – U.S. Senator from Massachusetts (President pro tempore of the Senate) and Speaker of the U.S. House of Representatives
Roger Sherman (1721–1793) – U.S. Senator from Connecticut and delegate to Continental Congress; signer of Declaration of Independence, Articles of Confederation, and U.S. Constitution (born in Newton, Massachusetts)
Charles Sumner (1811–1874) – U.S. Senator from Massachusetts; notable leader of the Radical Republicans
John E. Sununu (born 1964) – U.S. Senator from New Hampshire (born in Boston)
Paul Tsongas (1941–1997) – U.S. Senator from Massachusetts and 1992 Democratic presidential candidate
Elizabeth Warren (born 1949) – U.S. Senator from Massachusetts (incumbent) and 2020 Democratic presidential candidate
Daniel Webster (1782–1852) – U.S. Senator and Congressman from Massachusetts, and U.S. Secretary of State
Henry Wilson (1812–1875) – U.S. Senator from Massachusetts

United States Representatives

Jake Auchincloss (born 1988) – current U.S. Congressman for Massachusetts's 4th congressional district
Katherine Clark (born 1963) – current U.S. Congresswoman for Massachusetts's 5th congressional district
Susan Davis (born 1944) – U.S. Congresswoman from California (born in Cambridge, Massachusetts)
Bill Keating (born 1952) – current U.S. Congressman for Massachusetts's 9th congressional district
Joseph P. Kennedy II (born 1952) – U.S. Congressman from Massachusetts 
Joseph P. Kennedy III (born 1980) – U.S. Congressman from Massachusetts 
Patrick J. Kennedy (born 1967) – U.S. Congressman from Rhode Island (born in Brighton, Massachusetts)
Stephen F. Lynch (born 1955) – current U.S. Congressman for Massachusetts's 8th congressional district
John W. McCormack (1891–1980) – longtime U.S. Congressman from Massachusetts and Speaker of the United States House of Representatives
Jim McGovern (born 1959) – current U.S. Congressman for Massachusetts's 2nd congressional district
Seth Moulton (born 1978) – current U.S. Congressman for Massachusetts's 6th congressional district
Richard Neal (born 1949) – current U.S. Congressman for Massachusetts's 1st congressional district
Tip O'Neill (1912–1994) – longtime U.S. Congressman from Massachusetts and Speaker of the United States House of Representatives
Ayanna Pressley (born 1974) – current U.S. Congresswoman for Massachusetts's 7th congressional district
Lori Trahan (born 1973) – current U.S. Congresswoman for Massachusetts's 3rd congressional district

Other politicians
Joe Arpaio (born 1932) – sheriff of Maricopa County, Arizona (born in Springfield, Massachusetts)
William M. Bulger (born 1934) – former President of the Massachusetts State Senate and former president of the University of Massachusetts
Andrew Card (born 1947) – Massachusetts state legislator, U.S. Secretary of Transportation, White House Chief of Staff
P.J. Crowley (born 1951) – Assistant Secretary of State for Public Affairs under President Obama
Bill de Blasio (born 1961) – 109th (incumbent) Mayor of New York City (raised in Cambridge, Massachusetts)
Thomas Finneran (born 1950) – Speaker of the Massachusetts House of Representatives
John F. Fitzgerald (1863–1950) – U.S. Congressman from Massachusetts, 38th and 40th Mayor of Boston; maternal grandfather of President John F. Kennedy
Richard Goodwin (1931–2018) – speechwriter for John F. Kennedy, Lyndon B. Johnson, and Robert F. Kennedy; congressional investigator
Nathaniel Gorham (1738–1796) – Massachusetts delegate and 6th President of the Continental Congress
Tim Hickey (born 1938) – Deputy State Treasurer of Massachusetts
Kim Janey (born 1965) – Acting Mayor of Boston
John F. Kelly (born 1950) – U.S. Secretary of Homeland Security under President Donald Trump
Jean Kennedy Smith (1928– 2020) – U.S. Ambassador to Ireland
P. J. Kennedy (1858–1929) – member of the Massachusetts state legislature
Harold Hongju Koh (born 1954) – Legal Adviser of the Department of State under President Obama
Gina McCarthy (born 1954) – EPA Administrator under President Obama
Thomas Menino (1942–2014) – longest-serving Mayor of Boston
Ernest Moniz (born 1944) – U.S. Secretary of Energy under President Obama
Peter R. Orszag (born 1968) – Director of the Office of Management and Budget under President Obama
Frances Perkins (1880–1965) – U.S. Secretary of Labor (1933–1945); first woman appointed to the U.S. Cabinet
Timothy Pickering (1745–1829) – U.S. Secretary of State, Massachusetts politician, soldier in Continental Army in the American Revolution
Cass Sunstein (born 1954) – Administrator of the White House Office of Information and Regulatory Affairs under President Obama
Marty Walsh (born 1967) – 54th Mayor of Boston and current United States Secretary of Labor

First Ladies
Abigail Adams (1744–1818) – First Lady of the United States

Lawyers and jurists

F. Lee Bailey – criminal defense attorney; member of the "Dream Team"
Martha Coakley – former Massachusetts Attorney General, U.S Senate candidate
Caleb Cushing – former U.S. Attorney General 
William Cushing – one of the original Associate Justices of the U.S. Supreme Court
Charles Devens – former U.S. Attorney General, Union Army commander in the Civil War
Charles Garry − civil rights attorney
Horace Gray – former Associate Justice of the U.S. Supreme Court; Chief Justice of Massachusetts Supreme Court
Maura Healey – Massachusetts Attorney General (incumbent)
Oliver Wendell Holmes Jr. – former Associate Justice of the U.S. Supreme Court; Chief Justice of Massachusetts Supreme Court; known for "Clear and present danger" opinion in Schenck v. United States
Michael LeMoyne Kennedy − lawyer, businessman, and political activist in Massachusetts
David Kris – Assistant Attorney General under President Obama
William Henry Moody – former Associate Justice of the U.S. Supreme Court; U.S. Attorney General; U.S. Secretary of the Navy
James Otis Jr. – lawyer; known for his catchphrase "No taxation without representation"
Irving Picard – attorney in the Madoff scandal
Josiah Quincy II – Boston lawyer
Elliot Richardson – U.S. Attorney General during Nixon administration; former Massachusetts Attorney General 
Joseph Story – former Associate Justice of the U.S. Supreme Court
Webster Thayer – justice on the Massachusetts Superior Court, best known for Sacco and Vanzetti trial

Religion

Richard Alpert (Ram Dass) – spiritual teacher
Alice Blanchard Coleman – missionary society leader
Russell Conwell – Baptist minister, orator, philanthropist, lawyer, and writer
Mary Dyer – martyr
Mary Baker Eddy – founder of Christian Science
Ralph Waldo Emerson – Unitarian and Transcendentalist
Louis Farrakhan – Nation of Islam leader
Mary H. Graves – Unitarian minister, literary editor, writer
Edward Everett Hale – religious leader
John Harvard – clergyman and namesake of Harvard University
Martha Hooper Blackler Kalopothakes – missionary, journalist, translator
Bernard Francis Law – archbishop and cardinal
Emmanuel Lemelson – Greek Orthodox priest, investor and philanthropist
Cotton Mather – minister
Increase Mather – minister
Dwight Lyman Moody – evangelist, founder of the Northfield Mount Hermon School
Edmund Sears – Unitarian parish minister who penned "It Came upon the Midnight Clear" in 1849
Samuel Webber – clergyman, mathematician, and academic

Science, engineering, and medicine

Cyrus Alger – metallurgist, arms manufacturer and inventor
Ethan Allen – co-inventor of the single-action revolver
Johnny Appleseed – pioneer nurseryman 
Jerome Apt – astronaut
Nima Arkani-Hamed – theoretical physicist
Elliot Aronson – psychologist
Charlotte Barnum – mathematician
Clara Barton – nurse, founder of the American Red Cross
Florence Bascom – Geologist, first woman to graduate with a Ph.D. from Johns Hopkins, started geology department at Bryn Mawr
Alexander Graham Bell – inventor
Sir Tim Berners-Lee – World Wide Web; MIT professor
Ephraim Wales Bull – cultivator of the Concord grape
Luther Burbank – horticulturist
William Burt – inventor, surveyor, and millwright
Vannevar Bush – engineer, inventor and science administrator
Rachel Fuller Brown – chemist
Noam Chomsky – linguist
Michael Cohen – first doctor to diagnose Proteus syndrome
Morris Cohen – metallurgist
William D. Coolidge – physicist
Elias James Corey – chemist, Nobel Prize in Chemistry 1990
Jeff Corwin – biologist, wildlife conservationist, and television personality
William Healey Dall – naturalist, malacologist
Daniel Dennett – cognitive scientist and philosopher
Benjamin Franklin – scientist, diplomat, public official
Seraph Frissell – physician, medical writer
Buckminster Fuller – architect, systems theorist, author, designer, and inventor
Robert Goddard – inventor
Ward Goodenough – anthropologist
Charles Goodyear – inventor
Temple Grandin – doctor of animal science and professor at Colorado State University
Sylvester Graham – inventor
Crawford Greenewalt – chemical engineer 
Frederick Hauck – NASA astronaut
Elias Howe – inventor
Dan Itse – chemical engineer and New Hampshire public official
Melvin Johnson – prominent firearms designer
Richard Karp – computer scientist, computational theorist
Alan Kay – computer scientist
Nathaniel S. Keith – manufacturer, chemist, inventor, and electrical engineer
Robert Lanza – medical doctor, scientist
Lewis Howard Latimer – inventor and draftsman
Erasmus Darwin Leavitt Jr. – mechanical engineer
Henrietta Swan Leavitt – astronomer
Gilbert N. Lewis – physical chemist, discovered covalent bonds
Robert Lindsay – physicist, specializing in acoustics
Richard Lindzen – atmospheric physicist
Arthur Little – chemist and chemical engineer
Percival Lowell – astronomer
Elizabeth Marston – psychologist, co-creator of Wonder Woman
William Marston – psychologist, co-creator of Wonder Woman
John McCarthy – computer scientist, cognitive scientist
Albert Abraham Michelson – physicist, first American to receive the Nobel Prize in science
Maria Mitchell – first U.S. female astronomer
Samuel Morse – painter, co-developer of Morse code
William T.G. Morton – dentist and physician
Richard Muther – industrial engineer
Lloyd Ohlin – sociologist and criminologist
Robert T. Paine – ecologist
Charles Sanders Peirce – logician, mathematician, philosopher, and scientist
Jacob Perkins – inventor, mechanical engineer and physicist
Gregory Pincus – scientist, developed birth control pill
Rufus Porter – inventor
Cornelius Rhoads – pathologist and oncologist
Albert Sacco – chemical engineer and payload specialist for NASA
John Henry Schwarz – theoretical physicist
Samuel Scudder – entomologist and palaeontologist
Andrew Strominger – theoretical physicist
Benjamin Thompson – physicist and inventor
Edward Thorndike – psychologist
Janice E. Voss – engineer, NASA astronaut
An Wang – inventor, computer engineer, co-founder of Wang Laboratories
Worcester Warner – mechanical engineer, astronomer
Samuel Wellman – inventor of the crucible steel furnace
David Ames Wells – engineer, textbook author, economist
Daniel Wesson – firearms designer
Charles Abiathar White – geologist, paleontologist
Frank C. Whitmore – chemist 
Eli Whitney – inventor
Kenneth G. Wilson – theoretical physicist
John Winthrop – mathematician, physicist, astronomer
Robert Wood – physicist, inventor
Sewall Wright – geneticist

Others
Henry Adams – historian
Jane Kelley Adams — educator
Bhumibol Adulyadej – King of Thailand
Lillian Asplund – last survivor of the RMS Titanic who remembered the actual sinking
Sarah Lord Bailey – elocutionist and teacher
E. Florence Barker – activist
Nathaniel Bowditch – mathematician
Eva Maria Brown – reformer, activist, legal writer 
Julia Knowlton Dyer – philanthropist
Susan Fessenden – activist, reformer
Isaac Greenwood – mathematician
Kevin Hassett – economist, specializing in macroeconomics and tax policy
John Kneller – English-American professor and fifth President of Brooklyn College
Jill Lepore – historian
Corey Lewandowski – campaign manager for Donald Trump's 2016 presidential campaign
Carroll Quigley – historian and theorist of the evolution of civilizations
Acharya S – internet personality, conspiracy theorist
Monroe and Isabel Smith – co-founders of American Youth Hostels

See also

 Lists of Americans
 List of people from Concord, Massachusetts

References